Umrao Jaan Ada is a 1972 Pakistani musical romantic drama film loosely based on the novel of the same name by Mirza Hadi Ruswa and directed by Hassan Tariq with lyrics and screenplay by Saifuddin Saif. Rani played the titular role in the film opposite Shahid while Zmurrud, Aasia, Nayyar Sultana, Rangeela and Allauddin appeared in supporting roles. It revolves around the entire life journey of a tawaif from Lucknow and her tragic romance with a Nawab. The film was a golden jubilee hit a Box office. Lok Virsa Museum screened the film in 2017 as part of special showcase of the feature films in the country.

Plot 

Umrao Jaan is born as Amiran' to a modest family in Faizabad, India. After the criminal Dilawar Khan is released from jail he decides to get revenge as her father had earlier testified against him in court. Khan kidnaps Amiran and decides to sell her in Lucknow. She is imprisoned with another girl, Ram Dai, but the two are separated when Dilawar Khan takes her to Lucknow. There she is sold for 150 rupees to Khanum Jaan, the head tawaif of a kotha. She is renamed Umrao and begins to study classical music and dance. Together with the other apprentice tawaif and Gauhar Mirza, the mischievous illegitimate son of a local Nawab, she is taught to read and write in both Urdu and Persian. As Umrao grows up, she is surrounded by a culture of luxury, music and poetry. She eventually gains her first client, (earning her the suffix of jaan) but prefers the impoverished Gauhar Mirza, as her friend.

Umrao Jaan attracts the handsome and wealthy Nawab Sultan. The couple fall in love, but after a jealous customer tries to start a fight with Nawab Sultan, he shoots him and the jealous customer Zabardast Khan dies. He no longer comes to the kotha and Umrao Jaan must meet him secretly, by the help of Gauhar Mirza. As Umrao Jaan continues to see Nawab Sultan and also serve other clients, she supports Gauhar Mirza with her earnings. A new client, the mysterious Faiz Ali, showers Umrao Jaan with jewels and gold, but warns her not to tell anyone about his gifts. When he invites her to travel to Farrukhabad, Khanum Jaan refuses, so Umrao Jaan had to run away. On the way to Farrukhabad, they are attacked by soldiers and Umrao Jaan discovers that Faiz is a dacoit and all of his gifts have been stolen goods. Faiz Ali escapes with his brother Fazl Ali and she is imprisoned, but luckily one of the tawaif from Khanum Jaan's kotha is in the service of the Raja whose soldiers arrested her so Umrao Jaan is freed. As soon as she leaves the Raja's court, Faiz Ali finds her and gets her to come with him. He is soon captured and Umrao Jaan, reluctant to return to Khanum Jaan, sets up as a tawaif in Kanpur. While she is performing in the house of a kindly Begum, armed bandits led by Fazl Ali try to rob the house, but leave when they see that Umrao Jaan is working there. Then Gauhar Mirza comes to Kanpur and she decides to return to the kotha.

Umrao Jaan performs at the court of Wajid Ali Shah until the Siege of Lucknow forces her to flee the city for Faizabad. There she finds her mother, but is threatened by her brother who considers her a disgrace and believes she would be better off dead. Devastated, Umrao Jaan returns to Lucknow now that the mutiny is over. She meets the Begum from Kanpur again in Lucknow and discovers that she is actually Ram Dai. By a strange twist of fate Ram Dai was sold to the mother of Nawab Sultan and the two are now married. Another ghost of Umrao Jaan's past is put to rest when Dilawar Khan is arrested and hung for robbery. With her earnings and the gold that Faiz Ali gave her, she is able to live comfortably and eventually retires from her life as a tawaif.

Cast 
 Rani as Umrao Jaan
 Nayyar Sultana as Khanam
 Shahid as Nawab Saleem
 Talish
 Zumurrud
 Aasia
 Mumtaz
 Saeed Khan Rangeela
 Lehri
 Ladla
 Imdad Hussain
 Talat Siddiqui (guest)
 Kemal Irani (guest)

Music
 "Kaatay Na Katay Ratya Sayyan Intezar Ki" Sung by Runa Laila, lyrics by Saifuddin Saif and music of Nisar Bazmi
 "Aakhri Geet Sunanay Kay Liyay Aaey Hain" Sung by Noor Jehan, lyrics by Saifuddin Saif and music of Nisar Bazmi.

Box office
The film was a golden jubilee hit at box office.

References

External links 
Umrao Jaan Ada's film song on yahoo.com website
 

1972 films
1970s Urdu-language films
Films based on Indian novels
Pakistani romantic drama films
Films scored by Nisar Bazmi
Urdu-language Pakistani films